Ægir Þór Steinarsson (born May 10, 1991) is an Icelandic basketball player for LEB Oro club CB Lucentum Alicante and the Icelandic national team, where he participated at the EuroBasket 2015 and EuroBasket 2017.

College
Ægir played with Newberry from 2011 to 2013.

Career
Ægir started his career with Fjölnir and was named to the 1. deild karla Domestic All-First team in 2009. The following season, he was selected to the Icelandic All-Star game, when he also won the three-point contest, and again in 2011.

In September 2015, Ægir signed with KR of the Icelandic Úrvalsdeild karla. On February 13, 2016, he helped the team win the Icelandic Cup. Two weeks later, KR allowed Ægir out of his contract to sign with Spanish club Peñas Huesca of the LEB Oro.

In July 2016, Ægir signed with Miraflores  In July 2017, he helped the club achieve promotion to Liga ACB.

On 17 July 2018, Ægir signed with Stjarnan of the Úrvalsdeild karla after rejecting an offer from KR.

On 17 February 2019, Ægir had 8 points and 8 assists in Stjarnan's 84-68 victory against Njarðvík in the Icelandic Cup finals.

After the Úrvalsdeild playoffs ended, Ægir signed with Regatas Corrientes of the Liga Nacional de Básquet for the rest of the season. On 5 June, Regatas lost to Instituto Atlético Central Córdoba in the fifth game of the best-of-five series in the quarter finals of the LNB playoffs.

Stjarnan opened the 2019–20 season with an 89-77 win against reigning champions KR in the annual Icelandic Super Cup where Ægir posted 10 points and 6 assists. On 15 February 2020, Ægir was named the Icelandic Cup Finals MVP after scoring 19 points and handing out 14 assists in Stjarnan's 75-89 win against Grindavík in the Cup final.

For the 2020–21 regular season, Ægir averaged 16.0 points and 8.3 assists per game. In the playoffs, he averaged 21.7 points and 7.9 assists per game, helping Stjarnan to the semi-finals where they lost 2–3 to eventual champions Þór Þorlákshöfn.

In July 2021, Ægir signed with LEB Gold club Gipuzkoa Basket. On 26 September 2021, he won the Euskal Kopa with Gipuzkoa.

In July 2022, Ægir signed with CB Lucentum Alicante.

References

1991 births
Living people
AB Castelló players
CB Lucentum Alicante players
CB Miraflores players
CB Peñas Huesca players
Expatriate basketball people in Sweden
Aegir Steinarsson
Gipuzkoa Basket players
Aegir Steinarsson
Aegir Steinarsson
Aegir Steinarsson
Aegir Steinarsson
Aegir Steinarsson
Newberry Wolves men's basketball players
Point guards
Regatas Corrientes basketball players
Aegir Steinarsson
Aegir Steinarsson
Sundsvall Dragons players
Aegir Steinarsson